Otep Shamaya is an American singer and rapper, best known as the lead vocalist and founder of the eponymous metal band Otep.

Career
Shamaya made her debut in 2000 with her band OTEP, and released the full-length albums Sevas Tra (June 2002), House of Secrets (July 2004), The Ascension (October 2007), Smash the Control Machine (August 2009), Atavist (April 2011), Hydra (January 2013), and Shamaya released her latest album, "Generation Doom" via Napalm Records on April 15, 2016. The album debuted on Billboard at #10 on the Independent Chart, #7 on the Rock Chart, #4 on the Hard Rock Chart and #109 on the Top 200 Albums Chart, according to Nielsen SoundScan.

Shamaya is featured in The Hobbit: Battle of the Five Armies as a voice-over actor for creatures. Shamaya has been featured on HBO's television series Def Poetry. In 2010, Shamaya was a GLAAD Nominee for Outstanding Music Artist, alongside Lady Gaga (who won) and Adam Lambert.

Personal life
Shamaya is openly a lesbian  and a vegan. She is known to be an advocate of animal rights. Shamaya also spoke at the 2008 Democratic National Convention.

Discography

References

External links

 Otep's Merch
 Otep at Last.fm

American rock songwriters
American rock singers
American women heavy metal singers
American women rappers
American lesbian musicians
American lesbian writers
American LGBT singers
American LGBT songwriters
Living people
Nu metal singers
Musicians from Los Angeles
LGBT rappers
American LGBT poets
American women poets
American contraltos
Lesbian singers
Lesbian songwriters
Lesbian poets
Singer-songwriters from California
21st-century American rappers
21st-century American women musicians
21st-century American poets
20th-century American LGBT people
21st-century American LGBT people
1979 births
21st-century women rappers
American anarchists